Stade de l'Avenir is a multi-use stadium in Miquelon-Langlade, Saint Pierre and Miquelon. It is currently used mostly for football matches.

External links
 Worldstadiums

Football venues in France
Football venues in Saint Pierre and Miquelon
Miquelon-Langlade